The Nerekhta is a river in Vladimir Oblast in Russia, a right tributary of the Klyazma (Volga's basin). The Nerekhta freezes up in November and breaks up in April.

References 

Rivers of Vladimir Oblast